Messoud Ashina (born December 29, 1965) is a Danish-Azerbaijani neurologist and neuroscientist. He is currently a Professor of Neurology at the University of Copenhagen and leads the Human Migraine Research Unit at the Danish Headache Center, Rigshospitalet. Ashina is also the Director of the Danish Knowledge Center on Headache Disorders and the past President of the International Headache Society. As of 2023, Ashina is ranked as the world's leading expert on headache disorders by Expertscape.

Education 
Ashina earned his medical degree at the age 22 from Azerbaijan Medical University in 1988. He later received his PhD and D.M.Sc. degrees at University of Copenhagen and completed his residency in neurology at Rigshospitalet.

Personal life 
Messoud Ashina was born on December 29, 1965, in Baku, Azerbaijan. His father, Rustam Ashina was an architect, while his mother, Nelli Hajiyeva, is a retired biologist. His brother, Sait Ashina, is an Assistant Professor of Neurology, Anesthesia, Critical Care and Pain Medicine at Harvard Medical School and an Adjunct Associate Professor of Neurology at the University of Copenhagen.

He resides in Copenhagen and is married to Camilla Ashina who is a dentist. They have two children, Hakan and Sara.

Research 
Ashina is an acclaimed neuroscientist and considered one of the most prolific contributors to headache sciences. His academic works focus on migraine, which is a ubiquitous neurological disorder that affects more than one billion people worldwide. Ashina and his research lab have been key figures in the development and refinement of human provocation models that can be used to map signaling pathways underlying migraine pathogenesis and to identify novel drug targets. In these provocation models, endogenous signaling molecules or other hypothesized 'trigger' agents are used to induce migraine attacks in people with migraine, whereas healthy volunteers most often develop no more than a mild headache.

In his early work, Ashina and colleagues discovered that intravenous infusion of pituitary adenylate cyclase-activating polypeptide-38 (PACAP-38) induced migraine attacks in about 60% of people with migraine without aura. Ashina then posited that accumulation of intracellular cyclic adenosine monophosphate (cAMP) must play an important role in migraine pathogenesis because the intracellular effects of PACAP-38 receptor-binding are mediated by cAMP-dependent signaling pathways. This was confirmed by Ashina's lab when oral administration of cilostazol - a blocker of cAMP degradation - induced migraine attacks in about 80% of people with migraine without aura. Ashina later hypothesized that downstream effects of cAMP-mediated migraine attacks were likely to involve opening of potassium channels. This hypothesis has been supported by experimental data from provocation studies, in which Ashina and colleagues demonstrated that openers of adenosine-triphosphate (ATP)-sensitive potassium channels and large conductance calcium-activated potassium channels induced migraine attacks in about 95 to 100% of people with migraine without aura. Furthermore, Ashina and colleagues have also found that intravenous infusion of an ATP-sensitive potassium channel opener appears to be a potent inducer of migraine attacks with aura in people with migraine with aura.

Mentor
Professor Ashina has mentored 16 PhD candidates:
 Familial hemiplegic migraine-an experimental genetic headache model (Jakob Møller Hansen, 2009)
Possible role of prostanoids in migraine and other headaches (Troels Wienecke, 2009)
Investigation of carbachol and PACAP38 in human headache and pain models (Henrik Winther Schytz, 2010)
Functional magnetic resonance imaging and experimental models of migraine (Mohammad Sohail Asghar, 2012)
Prostaglandins and prostaglandin receptor antagonism in migraines (Maria Antonova, 2012)
Investigations of functional and structural changes in a migraine with aura by MRI (Anders Hougaard, 2014)
Clinical and physiological characterization of PACAP38-induced headache and migraine (Faisal Mohammad Amin, 2014)
Cerebral autoregulation in cerebrovascular disease measured by NIRS (Dorte Phillip, 2015)
The role of genetics on migraine induction triggered by CGRP and PACAP38 (Song Guo, 2016)
Investigations of migraine with aura in human hypoxia model (Nanna Bjørkbom Arngrim, 2018)
MRI investigations of migraine without aura in an experimental human model (Sabrina Khan, 2019)
PET investigations of brain serotonin receptor binding in migraine patients (Marie Deen Christensen, 2019)
Investigations of the meningeal vasculature in the migraine brain using magnetic resonance imaging (Casper Emil Christensen, 2020)
MRI investigations of the brainstem in migraine patients (Samaira Younis, 2020)
Cluster Headache - human provocation models with CGRP and PACAP38 (Anne Luise Vollesen, 2020)
Investigation of pituitary adenylate cyclase-activating polypeptide isoforms in a human experimental model of headache (Hashmat Ghanizada, 2020)

Publications
Ashina has authored over 400 papers, abstracts and book chapters, including more than 300 registered publications in PubMed (1997-2023). He is the editor of the book 'Pathophysiology of Headaches'. His overall citation index is 20,142 (13,278 since 2018), and he has an H-index of 76 (58 since 2018).

References

Danish neuroscientists
Living people
1965 births